Alexander Arnold Mezan (born Jan Alexander Östlund on 2 November 1978) is a Swedish former professional footballer who played as a right-back. He began his professional career with AIK in 1995, and went on to play professionally in Portugal, the Netherlands, England, and Denmark before retiring in 2010. He won 22 caps for the Sweden national team between 2003 and 2006 and represented his country at UEFA Euro 2004.

Club career

Early career
Mezan started his career in the club IFK Österåker in his hometown Åkersberga. At the age of 16 he was drafted for AIK Fotboll, where he played as a striker. He scored the club's last goal of the 1998 season, which meant AIK won Allsvenskan, the Swedish championship. He had a loan period at Birmingham City but was not offered a contract, and in January 1999 had a trial at English club Sheffield Wednesday who were then in the Premier League, however this did not lead to a transfer. He briefly represented Vitória de Guimarães in Portugal but did not receive any playing time. He was subsequently transferred to IFK Norrköping and converted into a defender.

Hammarby IF
Mezan is one of the most beloved players in Hammarby IF in modern time, despite the fact that he made his break-through as an attacker in local rivals AIK. "Salle" immediately won the hearts of the Hammarby fans when he, in the very first minute of his very first appearance for Hammarby, dealt a hard tackle to his former teammate AIK player and legend Krister Nordin, in the indoors tournament "Nackas minne" ("Lennart "Nacka" Skoglund Memorial) 2003.

Mezan returned to Hammarby after his career as a member of the board for Hammarby Football.

Feyenoord
In July 2004, Mezan signed with Eredivisie's Feyenoord Rotterdam, playing his first match against Vitesse Arnhem.

Southampton
His nickname is "Salle", although the fans of Southampton have been calling him "Jesus" due to his flowing locks and beard, and he emerged as a cult hero for his hard tackles and marauding runs. On the final day of the 2005–06 Championship season, replica number 2 shirts flew out of the club shop, as Saints fans could be heard in matches chanting "Jesus is our right-back".

For the early part of the 2006–07 season he was in and out of the side but towards the end cemented his right-back position. He has always given whole-hearted commitment to the team and provided a more than useful option which allowed Chris Baird to move into the centre of the defence.

Mezan started 2007–08 well, having to compete for the No. 2 position with on-loan players Phil Ifil and Christian Dailly, who both departed from the team in January 2008.

On 2 July 2008, he was released by the Saints as a free agent.

Esbjerg fB
On 25 August 2008 he was presented as a new player in Danish club Esbjerg fB. His time in Esbjerg was blighted by injuries. On 25 January 2010, he was released from the club and he announced his retirement.

International career
Mezan made his debut for the Sweden national team in a friendly game against Egypt in November 2003.

He played for Sweden at the 2004 European Championship after being called up as an injury replacement for Michael Svensson. Despite being a regular fixture during the 2006 World Cup qualification stage, he was controversially overlooked for the 2006 World Cup squad and was never called up for the national team again.

Personal life 
After his professional footballing career, Mezan changed his last name from Östlund to Mezan. His daughter Nelly Mezan (born in December 2002) is a promising tennis player.

Career statistics

International

Honours 
AIK
Allsvenskan: 1998

References

External links

1978 births
Living people
Swedish footballers
Association football fullbacks
Sweden international footballers
Sweden under-21 international footballers
Sweden youth international footballers
UEFA Euro 2004 players
IF Brommapojkarna players
AIK Fotboll players
IFK Norrköping players
Hammarby Fotboll players
Feyenoord players
Southampton F.C. players
Esbjerg fB players
Vitória S.C. players
Allsvenskan players
Eredivisie players
Danish Superliga players
Swedish expatriate footballers
Swedish expatriate sportspeople in Portugal
Expatriate footballers in Portugal
Swedish expatriate sportspeople in the Netherlands
Expatriate footballers in the Netherlands
Swedish expatriate sportspeople in the United Kingdom
Expatriate footballers in England
Swedish expatriate sportspeople in Denmark
Expatriate men's footballers in Denmark
People from Österåker Municipality
Sportspeople from Stockholm County